At the end of the summer season, Drum Corps International (DCI) World Class corps compete to earn the title of DCI World Class Champion (formerly DCI Division I World Champion). The championships consist of 3 rounds—Preliminaries, Semifinals, and Finals—held on the first or second Thursday, Friday, and Saturday of August. Through 2010, all active World Class corps (22 corps as of 2016) competed in the Quarterfinals, with the top 17 advancing to the Semifinals. The top 12 corps from Semifinals then advanced to the Finals. Since the 2011 season, all active DCI corps (Open and World Class) have been permitted to compete for the championship. In this format, about 40 corps compete in Preliminaries, while the top 25 advances to Semifinals, with the top-scoring 12 advances to Finals. The champion is determined by the overall high score in the Finals competition. Due to the COVID-19 pandemic in 2020, the DCI World Championship and tour were cancelled. In 2021, to mark the return of drum corps, there were no scores given during the season, and the season concluded with a 3-day celebratory event at Lucas Oil Stadium consisting of exhibition performances.
 
Only 10 corps have ever won the title (including 3 ties):
Blue Devils – 20 titles (2 ties)
The Cadets – 10 titles (1 tie)
The Cavaliers – 7 titles (1 tie)
Santa Clara Vanguard – 7 titles (1 tie)
Madison Scouts – 2 titles
Phantom Regiment – 2 titles (1 tie)
Anaheim Kingsmen – 1 title
Star of Indiana – 1 title
Carolina Crown – 1 title
Bluecoats - 1 title

The Anaheim Kingsmen and Star of Indiana are no longer active.

External links 
 Drum Corps Repertoire Database
 Drum Corps International website

Drum and bugle corps